Estimates for the prevalence of disability in Indonesia vary widely based on criteria. The 2010 Indonesian census reports that only 4.29% of Indonesians have disabilities, with a rate of 3.94% among men and 4.64% among women. Data from the 2007 Riskesdas household survey, by contrast, based on a definition of having a lot of difficulty in at least one functional domain, gives a rate of disability of 11.05%, with 9.40% for males and 12.57% for females. Both sets of data show rates of disability rising significantly with age.

Indonesia is a party to the United Nations Convention on the Rights of Persons with Disabilities, having signed the treaty on 30 March 2007 and ratified it on 30 November 2011.

See also
Health in Indonesia
Rawinala

References